Holywood railway station was a railway station in Dumfries and Galloway north of Dumfries.

History 
The station opened on 15 October 1849 as Killylung. Within a year it was renamed as Holywood. The station is now closed, although the line through the station is still open. One platform still exists and a level crossing controlled by a signal box. The small village of Holywood with its church stands a little way off and the old creamery stands close by to the station site.

Views of Holywood signal box and level crossing

References

Notes

Sources

External links
Video and commentary on Holywood Railway Station.

Railway stations in Great Britain opened in 1849
Disused railway stations in Dumfries and Galloway
Railway stations in Great Britain closed in 1949
1849 establishments in Scotland
Former Glasgow and South Western Railway stations